Rumble Militia is punk/thrash metal group from Bremen, Germany. Founded in 1985, they notably released two albums and two EPs on Century Media.

Discography
 Fuck Off Commercial (1987, Atom H)
 En Nombre Del Ley EP (1988, Atom H)
 They Give You The Blessing (1990, Century Media)
 Stop Violence And Madness (1991, Century Media)
 Destroy Fascism EP (1991, Century Media)
 Wieviel Hass Wollt Ihr Noch? EP (1993, Century Media)
 Hate Me (1994, FBIS for Gangster Music)
 Set The World On Fire (2020, FBIS for Gangster Music)

References

External links 
 Official site
 

German thrash metal musical groups
German punk rock groups
Culture in Bremen (city)
Musical groups established in 1985
Century Media Records artists